Greater Boston is the metropolitan region of New England encompassing the municipality of Boston (the capital of the U.S. state of Massachusetts and the most populous city in New England) and its surrounding areas. The region forms the northern arc of the Northeast megalopolis, so Greater Boston means both a metropolitan statistical area (MSA) and a combined statistical area (CSA), which is broader. The MSA consists of most of the eastern third of Massachusetts, excluding the South Coast and Cape Cod; the CSA additionally includes the municipalities of Providence (capital of Rhode Island), Manchester (the largest city in the U.S. state of New Hampshire), Worcester (the second largest city in Massachusetts and in New England), the South Coast region, and Cape Cod. Greater Boston is the only CSA in New England that lies in three states (Massachusetts, New Hampshire, and Rhode Island); some definitions extend it into a fourth (Connecticut),and a fifth (Maine).

Some of Greater Boston's most well-known contributions involve the region's higher education and medical institutions. Greater Boston has been influential upon American history and industry.  The region and the state of Massachusetts are global leaders in biotechnology, engineering, higher education, finance, and maritime trade.

As of 2020, 64% of Massachusetts' population lives in the Greater Boston metropolitan region, and 88% of Massachusetts' population lives in the Boston Combined Statistical Area. Greater Boston is ranked tenth in population among US metropolitan statistical areas, home to 4,941,632 people as of the 2020 United States Census, and sixth among combined statistical areas, with a population of 8,466,186. The area has hosted many people and sites significant to American culture and history, particularly American literature, politics, and the American Revolution.

Plymouth was the site of the first colony in New England, founded in 1620 by the Pilgrims, passengers of the Mayflower. In 1692, the town of Salem and surrounding areas experienced one of America's most infamous cases of mass hysteria, the Salem witch trials. In the late 18th century, Boston became known as the "Cradle of Liberty" for the agitation there that led to the American Revolution.

The Greater Boston region has played a powerful scientific, commercial, and cultural role in the history of the United States. Before the American Civil War, the region was a center for the abolitionist, temperance, and transcendentalist movements. In 2004, Massachusetts became the first U.S. state to legally recognize same-sex marriage as a result of the decision of the Massachusetts Supreme Judicial Court in Boston. Many prominent American political dynasties have hailed from the Boston region, including the Adams and Kennedy families.

Harvard University in Cambridge is the oldest institution of higher learning in the United States, with the largest financial endowment of any university, and whose Law School has spawned a contemporaneous majority of United States Supreme Court Justices. Kendall Square in Cambridge has been called "the most innovative square mile on the planet", in reference to the high concentration of entrepreneurial start-ups and quality of innovation which have emerged in the vicinity of the square since 2010. Both Harvard University and the Massachusetts Institute of Technology, also in Cambridge, have been ranked among the most highly regarded academic institutions in the world.

Definitions

Metropolitan Area Planning Council (MAPC)

The most restrictive definition of the Greater Boston area is the region administered by the Metropolitan Area Planning Council. The MAPC is a regional planning organization created by the Massachusetts legislature to oversee transportation infrastructure and economic development concerns in the Boston area. The MAPC includes 101 cities and towns that are grouped into eight subregions. These include most of the area within the region's outer circumferential highway, I-495.

The eight sub regions and their principal towns are: Inner Core (Boston), Minuteman (Route 2 corridor), MetroWest (Framingham), North Shore (Lynn), North Suburban (Woburn), South Shore (Route 3 corridor), SouthWest (Franklin), and Three Rivers (Norwood).

Notably excluded from the MAPC and its partner planning body, the Boston Region Metropolitan Planning Organization, are the Merrimack Valley cities of Lowell, Lawrence, and Haverhill, much of Plymouth County, and all of Bristol County; these areas have their own regional planning bodies. Bristol County is part of the Greater Boston CSA, as part of the Providence MSA.

New England City and Town Area (NECTA)
 
Because New England's local governance model is organized around the smaller New England town unit, and has weak or non-existent county governments, the US Census Bureau organizes its urban regions in the New England around clusters of towns known as New England city and town areas (NECTAs) rather than around county borders as it does in the rest of the country.  The set of towns containing the core urbanized area, along with surrounding towns with strong social and economic ties to the core area, is defined as the Boston–Cambridge–Nashua, MA–NH Metropolitan NECTA. The Boston NECTA region is further subdivided into several NECTA divisions, which are listed below. The Boston, Framingham, and Peabody NECTA divisions together correspond roughly to the MAPC area. The total population of the Boston NECTA was 4,540,941.
Boston–Cambridge–Newton, MA NECTA Division (92 towns)
Framingham, MA NECTA Division (12 towns)
Peabody–Salem–Beverly, MA NECTA Division (4 towns)
Brockton–Bridgewater–Easton, MA NECTA Division (Old Colony region) (8 towns)
Haverhill–Newburyport–Amesbury, MA–NH NECTA Division (Merrimack Valley region) (21 towns)
Lawrence–Methuen–Salem, MA–NH NECTA Division (part of Merrimack Valley region) (4 towns)
Lowell–Billerica–Chelmsford, MA–NH NECTA Division (Northern Middlesex region) (15 towns)
Nashua, NH–MA NECTA Division (21 towns)
Taunton–Middleborough–Norton, MA NECTA Division (part of Southeastern region) (9 towns)
Lynn–Saugus–Marblehead, MA NECTA Division (5 towns)
Portland-South Portland-Biddeford, ME NECTA Division (61 towns)

Metropolitan Statistical Area (MSA)

An alternative definition defined by the United States Office of Management and Budget, using counties as building blocks instead of towns, is the Boston–Cambridge–Newton, MA–NH Metropolitan Statistical Area, which is further subdivided into three metropolitan divisions. The metropolitan statistical area had a total population of 4,941,632 as of the 2020 census and is the tenth-largest in the United States. The components of the metropolitan area are listed below.
Boston–Cambridge–Newton, MA–NH Metropolitan Statistical Area
Boston, MA Metropolitan Division
Norfolk County, Massachusetts
Plymouth County, Massachusetts
Suffolk County, Massachusetts
Cambridge–Newton–Framingham, MA Metropolitan Division
Essex County, Massachusetts
Middlesex County, Massachusetts
Rockingham County–Strafford County, NH Metropolitan Division
Rockingham County, New Hampshire
Strafford County, New Hampshire

Combined Statistical Area (CSA)
A wider functional metropolitan area based on commuting patterns is also defined by the Office of Management and Budget as the Boston–Worcester–Providence combined statistical area. This area consists of the metropolitan areas of Manchester, Worcester, Providence, as well as Cape Cod, in addition to greater Boston. The total population for the extended region was estimated at 8,466,186 at the 2020 census. The following areas, along with the above MSA, are included in the combined statistical area:

 Providence–Warwick, RI–MA Metropolitan Statistical Area
Bristol County, Massachusetts
Bristol County, Rhode Island
Kent County, Rhode Island
Newport County, Rhode Island
Providence County, Rhode Island
Washington County, Rhode Island
Worcester, MA–CT Metropolitan Statistical Area
Worcester County, Massachusetts
Windham County, Connecticut
Manchester–Nashua, NH Metropolitan Statistical Area
Hillsborough County, New Hampshire
Barnstable Town, MA Metropolitan Statistical Area
Barnstable County, Massachusetts
Concord, NH Micropolitan Statistical Area
Merrimack County, New Hampshire
Laconia, NH Micropolitan Statistical Area
Belknap County, New Hampshire
Portland, ME Micropolitan Statistical Area
Cumberland County, Maine
York County, Maine

Principal cities and towns
 
Cities and towns

Plymouth County:

Bristol County:

Norfolk County:

Suffolk County:

Essex County:

Middlesex County:

Worcester County:

Boston metropolitan area
The Census Bureau defines the following as principal cities in the Boston NECTA using criteria developed for what the Office of Management and Budget calls a Core Based Statistical Area:
Boston
Cambridge
Lowell
Providence
Quincy
Worcester

Largest cities and towns
Cities and towns in the Boston CSA with at least 50,000 residents:

Demographics

Population density
The most densely populated census tracts in the Boston CSA (2010):

Race and ethnicity
The 40 most diverse Census tracts in the Boston CSA:

The 40 census tracts in the Boston CSA with the highest percentage of residents who identify as Hispanic or Latino:

Census tracts in the Boston CSA with the highest percentage of residents who identify as Black American:

Census tracts in the Boston CSA with the highest percentage of residents who identify as Asian American:

Census tracts in the Boston CSA with the highest percentage of residents who identify as Irish American:

Census tracts in the Boston CSA with the highest percentage of residents who identify as Italian American:

Census tracts in the Boston CSA with the highest percentage of residents who identify as Portuguese American:

Census tracts in the Boston CSA with French or French Canadian listed as first ancestry:

Other
Greater Boston has a sizable Jewish community, estimated at between 210,000 people, and 261,000 or 5–6% of the Greater Boston metro population, compared with about 2% for the nation as a whole. Contrary to national trends, the number of Jews in Greater Boston has been growing, fueled by the fact that 60% of children in Jewish mixed-faith families are raised Jewish, compared with roughly one in three nationally.

The City of Boston also has one of the largest LGBT populations per capita. It ranks fifth of all major cities in the country (behind San Francisco, and slightly behind Seattle, Atlanta, and Minneapolis respectively), with 12.3% of the city identifying as gay, lesbian, or bisexual.

Higher education

A long established center of higher education, the area includes many community colleges, two-year schools, and internationally prominent undergraduate and graduate institutions. The graduate schools include highly regarded schools of law, medicine, business, technology, international relations, public health, education, and religion. Greater Boston contains seven R1 Research Institutions as per the Carnegie Classification of Institutions of Higher Education. This is, by far, the highest number of such institutions in a single Metropolitan Statistical Area in the United States.

Selected statistics
Changes in house prices for the Greater Boston area are publicly tracked on a regular basis using the Case–Shiller index; the statistic is published by Standard & Poor's and is also a component of S&P's 10-city composite index of the value of the residential real estate market.

Major companies

References:

Companies along, inside or outside I-495, outside Route 128 

 Abbott Laboratories, in Worcester (pharmaceutical laboratory)
 Advanced Cell Technology, in Worcester (research laboratory)
 AMD, in Boxborough
 Analog Devices, in Norwood
 Atlantic Broadband, in Quincy
 Atlantic Tele-Network, in Beverly
 Avid Technology, Inc, in Burlington (headquarters)
 Azimuth Systems, in Acton
 Bain & Company, in Boston (headquarters)
 Bain Capital, in Boston (headquarters)
 Bertucci's Corporation, in Northborough (headquarters)
 BJ's Wholesale Club, Inc., in Westborough (headquarters)
 Bose Corporation, in Framingham (headquarters)
 Boston Properties, Inc., in Boston (headquarters)
 Boston Scientific Corporation, in Marlborough (headquarters) 
 Charles River Laboratories, in Wilmington (headquarters)
 Cisco Systems, in Boxborough
 CommunityRoot, in Boston (headquarters)
 David Clark Company, in Worcester (manufacturer of space suits)
 Diebold, in Marlborough (regional headquarters)
 Dell Technologies, in Hopkinton (headquarters)
 Evergreen Solar, in Marlborough (headquarters)
 Hewlett-Packard, in Marlborough (regional headquarters)

 Schneider Electric, in Andover, Massachusetts
 HourlyNerd, in Boston
 Innerscope Research, in Boston (headquarters)
 Intel Corporation, in Hudson
 Kronos Incorporated, in Chelmsford, Massachusetts (headquarters)
 Marshalls, Inc, in Framingham (headquarters)
 The MathWorks, in Natick
 MITRE Corporation, in Bedford (headquarters)
 Morgan Construction Company, in Worcester (rolling steel mill technology)
 National Amusements, in Norwood (headquarters)
 Novartis,  in Cambridge (US headquarters)
 Philips Electronics North America, in Andover (regional headquarters)
 Philips Healthcare, in Andover (global headquarters) and Framingham
 Red Hat, in Westford (engineering headquarters)
 Reed & Barton in Taunton (factory and headquarters)
 Saint-Gobain, in Worcester
 Sepracor, Inc., in Marlborough (headquarters)
 Staples, Inc., in Framingham (headquarters)
 Stop & Shop, in Quincy (headquarters)
 TJX Corporation, in Framingham (headquarters)
 UniFirst, in Wilmington (headquarters)
 WB Mason, in Brockton (headquarters)
 Wyman-Gordon, in Grafton (complex metal components and products)

Companies along or inside I-95 (Route 128), not including Boston 

 Akamai Technologies, in Cambridge (headquarters)
 Athenahealth, in Watertown, Massachusetts (headquarters)
 AstraZeneca, in Waltham (R&D)
 BBN Technologies, in Cambridge (headquarters)
 Biocell Center, in Medford (North American headquarters)
 Biogen Idec, in Weston (North American headquarters)
 Carl Zeiss SMT, in Peabody (North American headquarters)
 Constant Contact, in Waltham
 Dunkin' Brands, in Canton (headquarters)
 Facebook, in Cambridge
 General Electric Aviation, in Lynn
 Global Partners, in Waltham (headquarters)
 Google Inc., in Cambridge
 Haemonetics, in Braintree
 IBM, in Waltham, Cambridge and Littleton
  InterSystems Corporation, in Cambridge (headquarters)
 iRobot Corporation, in Burlington (headquarters)
 Keurig, in Burlington (headquarters)
 Lionbridge, in Waltham (US headquarters)
 Meditech, in Westwood (headquarters)
 Microsoft Corporation, in Cambridge
 Millennium Pharmaceuticals, in Cambridge
 Moderna, in Cambridge (headquarters)
 National Amusements, in Dedham (headquarters)

 National Grid, in Waltham (US headquarters)
 NetApp Inc, in Waltham
 NetBlazr, in Watertown
 Nokia, in Burlington
 Novartis AG, Inc, in Cambridge (research headquarters)
 Novell, Inc., in Waltham
 Nuance Communications, in Burlington
 Oracle Corporation in Burlington
 Osram Sylvania in Danvers (headquarters)
 Parametric Technology Corporation in Needham (headquarters)
 Philips Lighting in Burlington
 Progress Software in Bedford (headquarters)
 Raytheon, in Waltham (headquarters)
 Sanofi Genzyme, in Cambridge (headquarters; many locations in the area)
 SharkNinja, in Needham (headquarters)
 SunSetter Products, LP, in Malden (headquarters)
 Teradyne, in North Reading (headquarters)
 Thermo Fisher Scientific, in Waltham (headquarters)
 TripAdvisor, LLC, in Needham (headquarters)
 Twitter, in Cambridge
 Vistaprint, in Lexington (North American headquarters)
 Wolverine World Wide, in Waltham, Massachusetts (headquarters for Keds, Saucony, Sperry Top-Sider, and Stride Rite)

Major companies inside Boston proper 

 American Tower (headquarters)
 Au Bon Pain (headquarters)
 Bain & Company (headquarters)
 Blue Cross Blue Shield of Massachusetts (headquarters)
 Boston Consulting Group (headquarters)
 Converse (headquarters)
 Fidelity Investments (headquarters)
 General Electric (headquarters)
 The Gillette Company, now owned by Procter & Gamble (headquarters)
 Houghton Mifflin Harcourt (headquarters)
 Iora Health (headquarters)
 John Hancock Financial Services, Inc, now the United States division of Canada's Manulife Financial
 Liberty Mutual (headquarters)
 LogMeIn (headquarters)
 LPL Financial (headquarters)

 Mendix (headquarters)
 New Balance Athletic Shoe, Inc. (headquarters)
 Partners HealthCare (moving to Assembly Row, Somerville)
 Puma (North American headquarters, moving to Assembly Row, Somerville)
 Putnam Investments (headquarters)
 Rapid7
 Reebok (US headquarters)
 Roku
 Sapient Corporation (headquarters)
 Sonesta International Hotels Corp. (headquarters)
 State Street Corporation (headquarters)
 Steward Health Care System (headquarters)
 Toast, Inc. (headquarters)
 Threat Stack (headquarters)
 Vertex Pharmaceuticals (headquarters)
 Wayfair (headquarters)
 Wellington Management Company (headquarters)
 Zipcar (headquarters)

Sports

Annual sporting events include:
 The Boston Marathon, which follows a course from Hopkinton to Boston
 The Head of the Charles Regatta
 The Lenox Industrial Tools 301, Sylvania 300 and New Hampshire Indy 225 auto races at the New Hampshire Motor Speedway oval track.

Transportation

Interstates

U.S. Routes

State Highways

Bridges and tunnels
 Boston University Bridge, carrying Route 2
Callahan Tunnel, carrying Route 1A Northbound
 Charles M. Braga Jr. Memorial Bridge, carrying Interstate 195
 Claiborne Pell Newport Bridge, carrying Route 138
 Fore River Bridge, carrying Massachusetts Route 3A
Harvard Bridge, carrying Route 2A
Longfellow Bridge, carrying Massachusetts Route 3, US Route 3, and the MBTA Red Line
North Washington Street Bridge, carrying Route 99
 Sumner Tunnel, carrying Route 1A Southbound
 Ted Williams Tunnel, carrying I-90
 Thomas P. O'Neill Jr. Tunnel, carrying I-93 and Routes 1 and 3 concurrently
 Tobin Bridge, carrying Route 1
 Zakim Bunker Hill Bridge, carrying Interstate 93, Route 1 and Route 3 concurrently

Airports
 Manchester–Boston Regional Airport in Manchester, New Hampshire
 T. F. Green Airport in Warwick, Rhode Island
 Hanscom Field in Bedford
 Norwood Memorial Airport
 Worcester Regional Airport
 Beverly Regional Airport
 Lawrence Municipal Airport

Rail and bus

 Massachusetts Bay Transportation Authority (MBTA, generally known as the "T") rapid transit lines:
 Red Line heavy rail: Cambridge–Braintree and Boston (Dorchester) 
 Orange Line heavy rail: Boston (Jamaica Plain)–Malden
 Blue Line heavy rail: Boston–Revere
 Green Line light rail/streetcar: Medford–Brighton and Newton
 Ashmont–Mattapan High-Speed Line streetcar: Ashmont–Milton–Mattapan
 Silver Line bus rapid transit South Station–Logan Airport and Downtown–
 MBTA Commuter Rail
 Old Colony Lines serving Plymouth County
 Providence/Stoughton Line serving northern Bristol County, central Norfolk County, Kent County, and Washington County, connecting to Providence, Rhode Island
 Fairmount Line shuttle service from South Station
 Franklin Line serving western Norfolk County
 Greenbush Line serving Boston's South Shore
 Needham Line serving Boston suburbs and Needham
 Framingham/Worcester Line serving southwestern Middlesex County, connecting to Worcester
 Fitchburg Line serving northwestern Middlesex County, connecting to Fitchburg
 Lowell Line serving northern Middlesex County
 Haverhill/Reading Line and Newburyport/Rockport Line serving Essex County & Boston's North Shore
 Amtrak service to New York City and Washington, D.C.
 Amtrak Downeaster service to Maine from North Station
 Massport Logan Express
 Plymouth & Brockton Street Railway Co.

The first railway line in the United States was in Quincy. See Neponset River.

The following Regional Transit Authorities have bus service that connects with MBTA commuter rail stations:
 Brockton Area Transit Authority
 Cape Ann Transportation Authority
 Greater Attleboro Taunton Regional Transit Authority
 Lowell Regional Transit Authority
 Merrimack Valley Regional Transit Authority
 MetroWest Regional Transit Authority
 Montachusett Regional Transit Authority
 Rhode Island Public Transit Authority
 Worcester Regional Transit Authority

Ocean transportation

 Port of Boston (Massport)
 Cape Cod Canal

Geography 
 Rivers
 Blackstone River
 Charles River
 Concord River
 Ipswich River
 Merrimack River
 Mystic River
 Neponset River
 Sudbury River
 Taunton River
 Weymouth Fore River
 Hills
 Bellevue Hill
 Great Blue Hill

Climate
The Boston area has humid continental climates (Dfa and Dfb under the Köppen climate classification system), with high humidity and precipitation year-round.

See also 

 Greater Boston League, a high school athletic conference in Massachusetts

Notes

References

Further reading

 An informative guidebook, with facts and data about literary figures, publishers, bookstores, libraries, and other historic sites on the newly designated Literary Trail of Greater Boston.

 
Greater Boston
Metropolitan areas of New Hampshire
Metropolitan areas of Rhode Island

Geography of New England
Regions of Massachusetts
Regions of Rhode Island
Regions of New Hampshire
Economy of the Northeastern United States
Northeast megalopolis